Slušovice is a town in Zlín District in the Zlín Region of the Czech Republic. It has about 2,900 inhabitants.

It is known throughout the former Czechoslovakia due to having been the site of an unusually successful and productive socialist collective farm JZD Slušovice.

Geography
It is lies in the Vizovice Highlands, on the Dřevnice River. The eponymous Slušovice Reservoir is located outside the municipal territory of the town.

History

The first written mention of Slušovice is from 1261. It obtained town privileges in 1446. The population increased considerably after World War II, when a large number of workers moved into the town to work in the growing collective farm.

With time, technological developments allowed for the manufacture of computers in the town's industrial complex. These computers were sold under the Slušovice brand, priced at 40,000 USD at the official exchange rate or 5,000 USD on the black market. As a result, the town became a showcase of Czechoslovakia's planned economy.

With the fall of communism in the Eastern Bloc, much of the industry in the town fell into decline. In 1996, Slušovice was returned town status.

Sights
The Church of the Nativity of Saint John the Baptist is the landmark of the town. It was built in 1812–1815.

Notable people
František Čuba (1936–2019), agronomist and politician; president of JZD Slušovice

Gallery

References

External links

 

Cities and towns in the Czech Republic
Populated places in Zlín District
Moravian Wallachia